Yekaterina Tsevan (born 11 October 1989) is a Kazakhstani footballer who plays as a defender. She has been a member of the Kazakhstan women's national team.

References

1989 births
Living people
Women's association football defenders
Kazakhstani women's footballers
Kazakhstan women's international footballers